Gassama may refer to:

 Bakary Gassama (born 1977), Gambian football referee
 Lamine Gassama (born 1989), Senegalese footballer
 Malando Gassama (1946–1999), Gambian percussionist
 Omar Gassama, Gambian politician
 Sadio Gassama (born 1954), Brigadier General of the Malian military
 Saihou Gassama (born 1993), Gambian footballer